Korop is an urban-type settlement (town) in Novhorod-Siverskyi Raion, Chernihiv Oblast (province) of northern Ukraine. It hosts the administration of Korop settlement hromada, one of the hromadas of Ukraine. Population is 

The name of the settlement means "carp" in Ukrainian, and the fish is present in the coat of arms and flag of the settlement.

Korop cited first in hetman's Ostrianytsia universal statement in 1638. Many pre-historic settlements, dated to the 3rd to 5th centuries and the 10th to 13th centuries have been discovered near Korop.

Until 18 July 2020, Korop was the administrative center of Korop Raion. The raion was abolished in July 2020 as part of the administrative reform of Ukraine, which reduced the number of raions of Chernihiv Oblast to five. The area of Korop Raion was merged into Novhorod-Siverskyi Raion.

Notable people
 Nikolai Kibalchich, a Russian revolutionary, the main explosive expert who took part in the assassination of Tsar Alexander II of Russia.
 Demian Mnohohrishny, the hetman of Left-bank Ukraine from 1669 to 1672.
 Sergei Rudenko, a Soviet marshal of aviation

References

External links
 The murder of the Jews of Korop during World War II, at Yad Vashem website.

Krolevetsky Uyezd
Holocaust locations in Ukraine
Populated places on the Desna in Ukraine
Urban-type settlements in Novhorod-Siverskyi Raion